Tru Blu Entertainment Pty. Ltd. is an Australian publisher that is a subsidiary of Home Entertainment Suppliers, who distribute their titles. It was founded in 1999. Their debut title was 2003's Sidhe Interactive-developed Rugby League which released for Microsoft Windows, PlayStation 2 and Xbox. Tru Blu Entertainment specialises in sports titles, having released a number of rugby league, Australian rules football, cricket and horse racing titles.

Games published

See also

Rugby League (video game series)

References

External links
 

Companies based in Sydney
Video game companies established in 1999
Australian companies established in 1999
Video game companies of Australia
Video game publishers